Zoma is a genus of ray spiders that was first described by Michael I. Saaristo in 1996.  it contains three species, found in Japan, China, and on the Seychelles: Z. dibaiyin, Z. fascia, and Z. zoma.

See also
 List of Theridiosomatidae species

References

Further reading

Araneomorphae genera
Spiders of Africa
Spiders of Asia
Theridiosomatidae